Tolpis farinulosa is a species of flowering plants of the family Asteraceae. The species is endemic to Cape Verde. It is listed as endangered by the IUCN. Its local name is mato-branco ("white bush"), a name that may also refer to the species Phagnalon melanoleucum and Verbascum cystolithicum.

Distribution
The species is found in the west of Cape Verde, in the islands of Santo Antão, São Vicente, Ilhéu Raso, São Nicolau, Santiago, Fogo and Brava. The plant is found between 800 and 1800 m elevation. It grows in sub-humid and humid mountain areas.

References

Cichorieae
Endemic flora of Cape Verde